Valley Christian School is a private K–12 school in Youngstown, Ohio.

History and background
Valley Christian was founded as Youngstown Christian in 1975, and is religiously affiliated with the Assemblies of God Christian denomination. It is sponsored by local Assemblies of God Churches, primarily "Highway Tabernacle". Its mission statement is to prepare students for a life of ministry to Jesus Christ. It is known for being the only school in the Mahoning County area to have a United States Academic Decathlon team and for winning the Small School state championship twice in USAD. It was founded as a place for the evangelical Christian population in the Mahoning County area to go as the only other private schools are Roman Catholic in denomination. 
On June 2, 2013, 59 students graduated from Youngstown Christian, making it the largest class in the history of the school. Youngstown Christian was renamed Valley Christian in 2015 to better represent their geographic reach.

Valley Christian joined the White Division of the North Coast League for the 2015–2016 school year. They were previously in the East Suburban Conference. They then joined the Portage Trail Conference in 2017 and have been in the PTC ever since.

See also
Pentecostal

References

External links
 School Website

High schools in Mahoning County, Ohio
Private high schools in Ohio
Private middle schools in Ohio
Private elementary schools in Ohio